Pylaecephalidae is a family of dicynodont therapsids that includes Diictodon, Robertia, and Prosictodon from the Permian of South Africa. Pylaecephalids were small burrowing dicynodonts with long tusks. The family was first named in 1934 and was redefined in 2009. Diictodontidae and Robertiidae are considered junior synonyms of Pylaecephalidae; although Pylaecephalus itself is considered a junior synonym of Diictodon, the name Pylaecephalidae predates these names and therefore takes priority.

References

Prehistoric synapsids of Africa
Dicynodonts
Permian synapsids
Permian first appearances
Permian extinctions
Prehistoric therapsid families